is a shinto shrine in Hieda, a moated village located in Yamatokōriyama in Nara, Nara, Japan.

Shrine 
The main deity is Hieda no Are, who was involved in the compilation of the Kojiki, and Ame-no-Uzume-no-Mikoto and Sarutahiko Ōkami. Hieda no Are is the god of scholarship and storytelling.

Festivals 
The Hieda-No-Are festival takes place every year on August 16.

A Hieda-No-Are celebration was held on April 30, 2012 to mark the 1,300th anniversary of the compilation of the Kojiki.

Facilities 
 Kasuga Shrine
 Itsukushima Shrine
 Yabashira Shrine
 Storyteller Monument

References

 https://web.archive.org/web/20160509203008/http://www3.pref.nara.jp/miryoku/megurunara/inori/syaji/area02/metajinjya/

Shinto shrines in Nara Prefecture
Yamatokōriyama